Castle Kilbride is the former residence of James Livingston, a Canadian member of parliament, and owner of flax and linseed oil mills. It was designated a National Historic Site of Canada in March 1994.

It was built in Baden, Ontario in 1877 and named after Livingston's birthplace in Scotland. The major feature of Castle Kilbride is the interior decorative murals in the style of the Italian Renaissance. The trompe-l'œil technique used in the murals gives the illusion of three dimensions. The building is also an outstanding example of an Italianate villa of its place and time, and at the time of its building was a tribute to the reputation of its owner as the so-called 'Flax and Oil King of Canada'.

History
The original owner of Castle Kilbride was James Livingston.  He was born in East Kilbride, Scotland November 28, 1838.  James Livingston moved to Canada from Scotland around the age of 16.  Arriving to Canada impoverished , he migrated to Baden, and began working with his older brother John to earn simple wages to keep themselves. After a while the brothers pooled enough money to start a small flax farm.

In 1861, James Livingston married Louise Liersch. To make the processing of flax cheaper the brothers built a flax mill in 1863 and in 1864. Over the course of a little more than ten years James and John’s mill processed fifty-five tons of flax. Livingstone’s choice of crops was judicious; at the time there was a high demand for alternative textiles to cotton. This was due to the aftermath of Civil War in The United States causing massive devastation to the cotton industry. Flax was a particularly lucrative crop because of its multiple uses: flax crops can provide both hemp, for linen cloth production, and linseed oil.

The second mill that was built in Baden during the 1874 year was used to produce linseed oil.  With the inclusion of linseed oil in oil paint production, demand for linseed oil increased, prompting the Livingston brothers to create the 'J&J Livingston Linseed Oil Company'. By 1881 the Livingston brothers had more than 3000 acres that were being used for flax farming, and owned a highly profitable operation.

In tribute to his success, James Livingston built Castle Kilbride.  The house was built in 1877, which is also the year that James Livingston was elected Reeve of the Township of Wilmot.

James's older brother died in 1896 making him the head of the entire business. Eventually the operation of the Baden Linseed oil mill went to his son, John Peter.

Every year after James Livingston's retirement there was a picnic held for all of the company employees along with their families. Upon the death of Livingston, their son, John Peter, his wife Laura, and their daughter Laura Louise moved into Castle Kilbride. The Livingston oil company began to decline at the invention of latex paint.

Castle Kilbride was sold to the Township of Wilmot in 1993.

Building
The construction of Castle Kilbride took about one year to complete, finishing in 1878.  It was constructed by a local man, David Gingerich. The home consisted of three main stories and contained over 10,000 square feet of residential space. The only major addition occurred in 1920, when a summer kitchen was added.

Typical of its style, Castle Kilbride includes several fanciful features. The front lawn, for example, is heart-shaped, in tribute to Livingston’s wife Louise.

In 1988, the family sold the home’s belonging at auction before leaving it to sit empty for several years. In 1993, it was purchased by the Township of Wilmot, which undertook its restoration. In order to encourage preservation efforts, and in recognition of its interior decoration, Castle Kilbride was declared a National Historic Site in 1995.

Today, Castle Kilbride serves as an event venue and museum, displaying original furniture and household items as well as contemporary artifacts. In 2016 the grounds adjacent to the castle became home to the Prime Ministers Path, a series of bronze statues of Canadian Prime Ministers that invites visitors to explore the history of the country since Confederation.

See also
 List of historic places in Regional Municipality of Waterloo
 List of oldest buildings and structures in the Regional Municipality of Waterloo

References

Bibliography

External links 
Historic Castle Kilbride
Castle Kilbride Designated as a National Historic Site

National Historic Sites in Ontario
Historic house museums in Ontario
Museums in the Regional Municipality of Waterloo
History of Wilmot, Ontario
Italianate architecture in Canada
Designated heritage properties in Ontario